Quotation marks (also known as quotes, quote marks, speech marks, inverted commas, or talking marks) are punctuation marks used in pairs in various writing systems to set off direct speech, a quotation, or a phrase. The pair consists of an opening quotation mark and a closing quotation mark, which may or may not be the same character.

Quotation marks have a variety of forms in different languages and in different media.

History 
The single quotation mark is traced to Ancient Greek practice, adopted and adapted by monastic copyists. Isidore of Seville, in his seventh century encyclopedia, described their use of the Greek diplé (a chevron):

[13] ⟩ Diplé. Our copyists place this sign in the books of the people of the Church, to separate or to indicate the quotations drawn from the Holy Scriptures.

The double quotation mark derives from a marginal notation used in fifteenth-century manuscript annotations to indicate a passage of particular importance (not necessarily a quotation); the notation was placed in the outside margin of the page and was repeated alongside each line of the passage. In his edition of the works of Aristotle, which appeared in 1483 or 1484, the Milanese Renaissance humanist Francesco Filelfo marked literal and appropriate quotes with oblique double dashes on the left margin of each line. Until then, literal quotations had been highlighted or not at the author's discretion.  were marked on the edge. After the publication of Filelfo's edition, the quotation marks for literal quotations prevailed. During the seventeenth century this treatment became specific to quoted material, and it grew common, especially in Britain, to print quotation marks (now in the modern opening and closing forms) at the beginning and end of the quotation as well as in the margin; the French usage (see under Specific language features below) is a remnant of this. In most other languages, including English, the marginal marks dropped out of use in the last years of the eighteenth century. The usage of a pair of marks, opening and closing, at the level of lower case letters was generalized.

By the nineteenth century, the design and usage began to be specific to each region. In Western Europe the custom became to use the quotation mark pairs with the convexity of each mark aimed outward. In Britain those marks were elevated to the same height as the top of capital letters: .

In France, by the end of the nineteenth century, the marks were modified to an angular shape: . Some authors claim that the reason for this was a practical one, in order to get a character that was clearly distinguishable from the apostrophes, the commas, and the parentheses. Also, in other scripts, the angular quotation marks are distinguishable from other punctuation characters: the Greek breathing marks, the Armenian emphasis and apostrophe, the Arabic comma, the decimal separator, the thousands separator, etc. Other authors claim that the reason for this was an aesthetic one. The elevated quotation marks created an extra white space before and after the word, which was considered aesthetically unpleasing, while the in-line quotation marks helped to maintain the typographical color, since the quotation marks had the same height and were aligned with the lower case letters. Nevertheless, while other languages do not insert a space between the quotation marks and the word(s), the French usage does insert them, even if it is a narrow space.

The curved quotation marks ("66-99") usage, was exported to some non-Latin scripts, notably where there was some English influence, for instance in Native American scripts and Indic scripts.  On the other hand, Greek, Cyrillic, Arabic and Ethiopic adopted the French "angular" quotation marks, . The Far East angle bracket quotation marks, are also a development of the in-line angular quotation marks.

In Central Europe, the practice was to use the quotation mark pairs with the convexity aimed inward. The German tradition preferred the curved quotation marks, the first one at the level of the commas, the second one at the level of the apostrophes: . Alternatively, these marks could be angular and in-line with lower case letters, but still pointing inward: . Some neighboring regions adopted the German curved marks tradition with lower–upper alignment, while some adopted a variant with the convexity of the closing mark aimed rightward like the opening one, .

Sweden (and Finland) choose a convention where the convexity of both marks was aimed to the right but lined up both at the top level: .

In Eastern Europe, there was hesitation between the French tradition  and the German tradition . The French tradition prevailed in Eastern Europe (Russia, Ukraine, and Belarus), whereas the German tradition, or its modified version with the convexity of the closing mark aimed rightward, has become dominant in Southeastern Europe, e.g. in the Balkan countries.

The reemergence of single quotation marks  around 1800 came about as a means of indicating a secondary level of quotation. In some languages using the angular quotation marks, the usage of the single guillemet, became obsolete, being replaced by double curved ones: , though the single ones still survive, for instance, in Switzerland. In Russia, Ukraine and Belarus, the curved quotation marks, are used as a secondary level when the angular marks,  are used as a primary level.

In English  

In English writing, quotation marks are placed in pairs around a word or phrase to indicate:
 Quotation or direct speech: 
 Mention in another work of the title of a short or subsidiary work, such as a chapter or an episode: .
 Scare quotes, used to mean "so-called" or to express irony: .

In American writing, quotation marks are normally the double kind (the primary style). If quotation marks are used inside another pair of quotation marks, then single quotation marks are used. For example:  If another set of quotation marks is nested inside single quotation marks, double quotation marks are used again, and they continue to alternate as necessary (though this is rarely done).

British publishing is regarded as more flexible about whether double or single quotation marks should be used. A tendency to use single quotation marks in British writing is thought to have arisen after the mid-19th century invention of steam-powered presses and the consequent rise of London and New York as distinct, industrialized publishing centers whose publishing houses adhered to separate norms. The King's English in 1908 noted that the prevailing British practice was to use double marks for most purposes, and single ones for quotations within quotations. Different media now follow different conventions in the United Kingdom.

Different varieties and styles of English have different conventions regarding whether terminal punctuation should be written inside or outside the quotation marks. North American printing usually puts full stops and commas (but not colons, semicolons, exclamation or question marks) inside the closing quotation mark, whether it is part of the original quoted material or not. Styles elsewhere vary widely and have different rationales for placing it inside or outside, often a matter of house style.

Regarding their appearance, there are two types of quotation marks:

The left and right marks are identical. These are found on typical English typewriters and computer keyboards, although they are sometimes automatically converted to the other type by software.
(The doubled ones are more informally known as "66 and 99".) The beginning marks are commas raised to the top of the line and rotated 180 degrees. The ending marks are commas raised to the top of the line. Curved quotation marks are used mainly in manuscript, printing, and typesetting. Type cases (of any language) generally have the curved quotation mark metal types for the respective language, and may lack the vertical quotation mark metal types. Because most computer keyboards lack keys to enter typographic quotation marks directly, much that is written using word-processing programs has vertical quotation marks. The "smart quotes" feature in some computer software can convert vertical quotation marks to curly ones, although sometimes imperfectly.

The closing single quotation mark is identical in form to the apostrophe and similar to the prime symbol. The double quotation mark is identical to the ditto mark in English-language usage. It is also similar to—and often used to represent—the double prime symbol. These all serve different purposes.

Summary table 
Other languages have similar conventions to English, but use different symbols or different placement.

Specific language features

Bulgarian 
Contemporary Bulgarian employs em dash or quotation horizontal bar ( followed by a space characer) at the beginning of each direct-speech segment by a different character in order to mark direct speech in prose and in most journalistic question and answer interviews; in such cases, the use of standard quotation marks is left for in-text citations or to mark the names of institutions, companies, and sometimes also brand or model names.

Air quotes are also widely used in face-to-face communication in contemporary Bulgarian but usually resemble " ... " (secondary: ' ... ') unlike written Bulgarian quotation marks.

Dutch 

The standard form in the preceding table is taught in schools and used in handwriting.

Although not generally common in the Netherlands any more, double angle (guillemet) quotation marks are still sometimes used in Belgium. Examples include the Flemish HUMO magazine and the Metro newspaper in Brussels.

German 

The symbol used as the left (typographical) quote in English is used as the right quote in Germany and Austria and a "low double comma"  (not used in English) is used for the left quote. Its single quote form  looks like a comma.

Some fonts, e.g. Verdana, were not designed with the flexibility to use an English left quote as a German right quote. Such fonts are therefore typographically incompatible with this German usage.

Double quotes are standard for denoting speech in German.

  (Andreas asked me: "Have you read the 'EU Expansion' article?")

This style of quoting is also used in Bulgarian, Czech, Danish, Estonian, Georgian, Icelandic, Latvian, Lithuanian, Russian, Serbo-Croatian, Slovak, Slovene and in Ukrainian. 

Sometimes, especially in novels, guillemets (angle quotation mark sets) are used in Germany and Austria (albeit in reversed order compared to French): 

 
 Andreas asked me: "Have you read the 'EU Expansion' article?"

In Switzerland, the French-style angle quotation mark sets are also used for German printed text: «A ‹B›?»

 
 Andreas asked me: 'Have you read the "EU Expansion" article?'

Finnish and Swedish 

In Finnish and Swedish, right quotes, called citation marks, are used to mark both the beginning and the end of a quote. Double right-pointing angular quotes, can also be used.

Alternatively, an en-dash followed by a (non-breaking) space can be used to denote the beginning of quoted speech, in which case the end of the quotation is not specifically denoted (see section Quotation dash below). A line-break should not be allowed between the en-dash and the first word of the quotation.

French 

French uses angle quotation marks (guillemets, or duck-foot quotes), adding a 'quarter-em space' within the quotes. Many people now use the non-breaking space, because the difference between a non-breaking space and a four-per-em is virtually imperceptible (but also because the Unicode quarter-em space is breakable), and the quarter-em glyph is omitted from many fonts. Even more commonly, many people just put a normal (breaking) space between the quotation marks because the non-breaking space cannot be accessed easily from the keyboard; furthermore, many are simply not aware of this typographical refinement. Using the wrong type of space often results in a quotation mark appearing alone at the beginning of a line, since the quotation mark is treated as an independent word.

“Would you like a sandwich, Henri?”

Sometimes, for instance on several French news sites such as Libération, Les Échos or Le Figaro, no space is used around the quotation marks. This parallels normal usage in other languages, e.g. Catalan, Polish, Portuguese, Ukrainian, or in German, French and Italian as written in Switzerland:

  (Swiss Standard German)
  (Polish)
  (Ukrainian)
 “This is a quote.”

Initially, the French guillemet characters were not angle shaped but also used the comma (6/9) shape. They were different from English quotes because they were standing (like today's guillemets) on the baseline (like lowercase letters), and not above it (like apostrophes and English quotation marks) or hanging down from it (like commas). At the beginning of the nineteenth century, this shape evolved to look like  small parentheses . The angle shape appeared later to increase the distinction and avoid confusions with apostrophes, commas and parentheses in handwritten manuscripts submitted to publishers. Unicode currently does not provide alternate codes for these 6/9 guillemets on the baseline, as they are considered to be form variants of guillemets, implemented in older French typography (such as the Didot font design). Also there was not necessarily any distinction of shape between the opening and closing guillemets, with both types pointing to the right (like today's French closing guillemets).

They must be used with non-breaking spaces, preferably narrow, if available, i.e. U+202F  which is present in all up-to-date general-purpose fonts, but still missing in some computer fonts from the early years of Unicode, due to the belated encoding of U+202F (1999) after the flaw of not giving U+2008  non-breakable property as it was given to the related U+2007 .

Legacy support of narrow non-breakable spaces was done at rendering level only, without interoperability as provided by Unicode support.  High-end renderers as found in Desktop Publishing software should therefore be able to render this space using the same glyph as the breaking thin space U+2009, handling the non-breaking property internally in the text renderer/layout engine, because line-breaking properties are never defined in fonts themselves; such renderers should also be able to infer any width of space, and make them available as application controls, as is done with justifying/non-justifying.

In old-style printed books, when quotations span multiple lines of text (including multiple paragraphs), an additional closing quotation sign is traditionally used at the beginning of each line continuing a quotation; any right-pointing guillemet at the beginning of a line does not close the current quotation. This convention has been consistently used since the beginning of the 19th century by most book printers, but is no longer in use today. Such insertion of continuation quotation marks occurred even if there is a word hyphenation break. Given this feature has been obsoleted, there is no support for automatic insertion of these continuation guillemets in HTML or CSS, nor in word-processors. Old-style typesetting is emulated by breaking up the final layout with manual line breaks, and inserting the quotation marks at line start, much like pointy brackets before quoted plain text e-mail:

 

Unlike English, French does not set off unquoted material within a quotation by using a second set of quotation marks. Compare:
 
 “This is a great day for Montrealers, the minister maintained. These investments will stimulate economic growth.”

For clarity, some newspapers put the quoted material in italics:

 

The French Imprimerie nationale (cf. Lexique des règles typographiques en usage à l'Imprimerie nationale, presses de l'Imprimerie nationale, Paris, 2002) does not use different quotation marks for nesting quotes:
 
 "His 'explanation' is just a lie", the deputy protested.

In this case, when there should be two adjacent opening or closing marks, only one is written:
 
 He answered: "It's only a 'gizmo'."

The use of English quotation marks is increasing in French and usually follows English rules, for instance in situations when the keyboard or the software context doesn't allow the use of guillemets. The French news site L'Humanité uses straight quotation marks along with angle ones.

English quotes are also used sometimes for nested quotations:
 
 "His 'explanation' is just a lie", the deputy protested.

But the most frequent convention used in printed books for nested quotations is to style them in italics. Single quotation marks are much more rarely used, and multiple levels of quotations using the same marks is often considered confusing for readers:
 
 

Further, running speech does not use quotation marks beyond the first sentence, as changes in speaker are indicated by a dash, as opposed to the English use of closing and re-opening the quotation. (For other languages employing dashes, see section Quotation dash below.) The dashes may be used entirely without quotation marks as well. In general, quotation marks are extended to encompass as much speech as possible, including not just nonverbal text such as "he said" (as previously noted), but also as long as the conversion extends. The quotation marks end at the last spoken text rather than extending to the end of paragraphs when the final part is not spoken.
  (Dumas, Les trois mousquetaires)
 "I am not speaking to you, sir", he said.
 "But I am speaking to you!" cried the young man, exasperated by this combination of insolence and good manners, of protocol and disdain.

Greek 

Greek uses angled quotation marks ( – isagogiká):

and the quotation dash ( – pávla):

which translate to:
 "Is he serious?" he asked Maria.
 "Yes, certainly," she replied.

A closing quotation mark, is added to the beginning of each new quoted paragraph.

When quotations are nested, double and then single quotation marks are used: .

Hungarian 
According to current recommendation by the Hungarian Academy of Sciences the main Hungarian quotation marks are comma-shaped double quotation marks set on the base-line at the beginning of the quote and at apostrophe-height at the end of it for first level,, reversed »French quotes« without space (the German tradition) for the second level, and thus the following nested quotation pattern emerges:
 

... and with third level:
 

In Hungarian linguistic tradition the meaning of a word is signified by uniform (unpaired) apostrophe-shaped quotation marks:
 

A quotation dash is also used, and is predominant in belletristic literature.
 .

Hebrew 
In Israel, the original practice was to use modified German-style „low-high” quote marks, however since the 1990s, American-style "quote marks" have become the standard. (Note that Hebrew is written from right to left.)

Polish 
According to current PN-83/P-55366 standard from 1983 (but not dictionaries, see below), Typesetting rules for composing Polish text (Zasady składania tekstów w języku polskim) one can use either „ordinary Polish quotes” or «French quotes» (without space) for first level, and ‚single Polish quotes’ or «French quotes» for second level, which gives three styles of nested quotes:

 
 
 

There is no space on the internal side of quote marks, with the exception of  firet (≈  em) space between two quotation marks when there are no other characters between them (e.g. ,„ and ’”).

The above rules have not changed since at least the previous BN-76/7440-02 standard from 1976 and are probably much older.

The rules on the use of guillemets conflict with the Polish punctuation standard as given by dictionaries, including the Wielki Słownik Ortograficzny PWN recommended by the Polish Language Council. The PWN rules state:

In Polish books and publications, this style for use of guillemets (also known as »German quotes«) is used almost exclusively. In addition to being standard for second level quotes, guillemet quotes are sometimes used as first level quotes in headings and titles but almost never in ordinary text in paragraphs.

Another style of quoting is to use an em-dash to open a quote; this is used almost exclusively to quote dialogues, and is virtually the only convention used in works of fiction.

Mag skłonił się. Biały kot śpiący obok paleniska ocknął się nagle i spojrzał na niego badawczo.
— Jak się nazywa ta wieś, panie? — zapytał przybysz. Kowal wzruszył ramionami.
— Głupi Osioł.
— Głupi...?
— Osioł — powtórzył kowal takim tonem, jakby wyzywał gościa, żeby spróbował sobie z niego zażartować. Mag zamyślił się.
— Ta nazwa ma pewnie swoją historię — stwierdził w końcu. — W innych okolicznościach chętnie bym jej wysłuchał. Ale chciałbym porozmawiać z tobą, kowalu, o twoim synu.

The wizard bowed. A white cat that had been sleeping by the furnace woke up and watched him carefully.
“What is the name of this place, sir?” said the wizard.
The blacksmith shrugged.
“Stupid Donkey,” he said. [original English version is "Bad Ass", but that's not a common phrase in Polish]
“Stupid—?”
“Donkey,” repeated the blacksmith, his tone defying anyone to make something of it.
The wizard considered this.
“A name with a story behind it,” he said at last, “which were circumstances otherwise I would be pleased to hear. But I would like to speak to you, smith, about your son.”

(Terry Pratchett, Equal Rites)

An en-dash is sometimes used in place of the em-dash, especially so in newspaper texts.

Portuguese 

Neither the Portuguese language regulator nor the Brazilian prescribe what is the shape for quotation marks, they only prescribe when and how they should be used.

In Portugal, the angular quotation marks (ex. ) are traditionally used. They are the Latin tradition quotation marks, used normally by typographers. It is that also the chosen representation for displaying quotation marks in reference sources, and it is also the chosen representation from some sites dedicated to the Portuguese Language.

The Código de Redação for Portuguese-language documents published in the European Union prescribes three levels of quotation marks representation, :
E estava escrito «Alguém perguntou “Quem foi que gritou ‘Meu Deus!’?”.» na folha de papel.

And it was written “Someone asked ‘Who shouted “My God”!?’.” on the sheet of paper.
 in black: main sentence which contains the quotations;
 in green: 1st level quotation;
 in red: 2nd level quotation;
 in blue: 3rd level quotation;

The usage of curved quotation marks (ex. ) is growing in Portugal. That is probably due to the omnipresence of the English language and to the corresponding difficulty or even inability of some machines (mobile phones, cash registers, calculators, etc.) to enter the angular quotation marks.

In Brazil, angular quotation marks are rare, and curved quotation marks are almost always used. This can be verified by the difference between a Portuguese keyboard (which possesses a specific key for « and for ») and a Brazilian keyboard.

The Portuguese-speaking African countries tend to follow Portugal's conventions, not the Brazilian ones.

Other usages of quotation marks ( for double,  for single) are obsolete..

Belarusian, Russian, and Ukrainian 
In Belarusian, Russian, and Ukrainian, the angled quotation (Belarusian: «двукоссе», Russian: «кавычки», Ukrainian: «лапки») marks are used without spaces. In case of quoted material inside a quotation, rules and most noted style manuals prescribe the use of different kinds of quotation marks.

Example in Russian:

(Pushkin wrote to Delvig: "Waiting for 'Gypsies', and publish at once."

Example in Ukrainian:

"And, of course, you can't avoid using a dictionary. One of my acquaintances, a poet and literary critic, once jokingly said: 'I prefer to read dictionaries than poems. The dictionary has the same words as in the poem, but is presented in a systematic way'. It's a joke, but 'reading dictionaries' is not as amazing and bizarre as it may seem."

Spanish 

Spanish uses angled quotation marks ( or ) as well, but always without the spaces.

 
 "This is an example of how a literal quotation is usually written in Spanish."

And, when quotations are nested in more levels than inner and outer quotation, the system is:

 
 "Antonio told me, 'What a piece of "junk" Julián has purchased for himself'".
The use of English quotation marks is increasing in Spanish, and the El País style guide, which is widely followed in Spain, recommends them. Hispanic Americans often use them, owing to influence from the United States.

Chinese, Japanese and Korean
Corner brackets are well-suited for Chinese, Japanese, and Korean languages which are written in both vertical and horizontal orientations. China, South Korea, and Japan all use corner brackets when writing vertically. Usage differs when writing horizontally:
 In Japan, corner brackets are used.
 In South Korea, corner brackets and English-style quotes are used.
 In North Korea, angle quotes are used.
 In Mainland China, English-style quotes (full width “”) are official and prevalent; corner brackets are rare today. The Unicode codepoints used are the English quotes (rendered as fullwidth by the font), not the fullwidth forms.
 In Taiwan, Hong Kong and Macau, where Traditional Chinese is used, corner brackets are prevalent, although English-style quotes are also used.
 In the Chinese language, double angle brackets are placed around titles of books, documents, movies, pieces of art or music, magazines, newspapers, laws, etc. When nested, single angle brackets are used inside double angle brackets. With some exceptions, this usage parallels the usage of italics in English:
「你看過《三國演義》嗎？」他問我。
"Have you read Romance of the Three Kingdoms?", he asked me.
White corner brackets are used to mark quote-within-quote segments in case corner brackets are used.

Quotation dash 

Another typographical style is to omit quotation marks for lines of dialogue, replacing them with an initial dash, as in lines from James Joyce's Ulysses:

― O saints above! Miss Douce said, sighed above her jumping rose. I wished I hadn't laughed so much. I feel all wet.
― O Miss Douce! Miss Kennedy protested. You horrid thing!
This style is particularly common in Bulgarian, French, Greek, Hungarian, Polish, Portuguese, Romanian, Russian, Spanish, Swedish, Turkish, and Vietnamese. James Joyce always insisted on this style, although his publishers did not always respect his preference. Alan Paton used this style in Cry, the Beloved Country (and no quotation marks at all in some of his later work). Charles Frazier used this style for his novel Cold Mountain as well. Details for individual languages are given above.

The dash is often combined with ordinary quotation marks. For example, in French, a guillemet may be used to initiate running speech, with a dash to indicate each change in speaker and a closing guillemet to mark the end of the quotation.

Dashes are also used in many modern English novels, especially those written in nonstandard dialects. Some examples include:
 James Joyce's prose
 William Gaddis' prose
 Trainspotting by Irvine Welsh
 M/F by Anthony Burgess
 The Book of Dave by Will Self, which alternates between standard English chapters, with standard quotation marks, and dialect chapters, with quotation dashes
 A Scanner Darkly by Philip K. Dick (not written in dialect)
 The Ægypt Sequence by John Crowley, in extracts from the fictional writings of the character Fellowes Kraft, a historical novelist. According to another character, Kraft used dashes to indicate imaginary dialogue that was not documented in the original sources.
 The Van by Roddy Doyle
 You Shall Know Our Velocity by Dave Eggers, in which spoken dialogues are written with the typical English quotation marks, but dialogues imagined by the main character (which feature prominently) are written with quotation dashes
 A Winter in the Hills by John Wain in which conversations in English are indicated by ordinary quotation marks and in Welsh by quotation dashes
In Italian, Catalan, Portuguese, Spanish, Ukrainian, Russian, Polish, Bulgarian, Georgian, Romanian, Lithuanian and Hungarian, the reporting clause in the middle of a quotation is separated with two additional dashes (also note that the initial quotation dash is followed by a single whitespace character as well as the fact that the additional quotation dashes for the middle main clause after the initial quotation dash are all with a single whitespace character on both of their sides):

 
 
 "Oh dear!" exclaimed Levin. "I think it is nine years since I went to communion! I haven't thought about it."
 "You are a good one!" remarked Oblonsky, laughing. "And you call me a Nihilist! But it won't do, you know; you must confess and receive the sacrament."
 from Leo Tolstoy’s Anna Karenina (Louise and Aylmer Maude translation)

– Nem hagyják magukat, mozgásban maradnak – mondta Ron. – Ahogy mi is.
 "Well, they keep on the move, don't they?" said Ron. "Like us."
 From J. K. Rowling's Harry Potter and the Deathly Hallows  and its Hungarian translation by Tóth Tamás Boldizsár.

In Finnish, on the other hand, a second dash is added when the quote continues after a reporting clause:
 – Et sinä ole paljon minkään näköinen, sanoi Korkala melkein surullisesti, – mutta ei auta.
 "You don't seem to be anything special," said Korkala almost sadly, "but there's no help to it."

 – Frakki, älähti Huikari. – Missä on frakki?
 – Räätälissä, sanoi Joonas rauhallisesti.
 "Tailcoat", yelped Huikari. "Where is the tailcoat?"
 "At the tailor's", said Joonas calmly.

The Unicode standard introduced a separate character  to be used as a quotation dash. It may be the same length as an em-dash, which is often used instead. Some software will insert a line break after an em-dash, but not after a quotation dash. Both are displayed in the following table.

Electronic documents 

Different typefaces, character encodings and computer languages use various encodings and glyphs for quotation marks.

Typewriters and early computers 

'Ambidextrous' or 'straight' quotation marks  were introduced on typewriters to minimise the number of keys on the keyboard, and were inherited by computer keyboards and character sets. The ASCII character set, which has been used on a wide variety of computers since the 1960s, only contains a straight single quote and double quote.

Many systems, such as the personal computers of the 1980s and early 1990s, actually drew these ASCII quotes like closing quotes on-screen and in printouts, so text would appear like this (approximately): 

These same systems often drew the backtick (the free standing character ) as an 'open quote' glyph (usually a mirror image so it still sloped in the direction of a grave accent). Using this character as the opening quote gave a typographic approximation of curved single quotes. Nothing similar was available for the double quote, so many people resorted to using two single quotes for double quotes, which would look approximately like the following:

The typesetting application TeX uses this convention for input files. The following is an example of TeX input which yields proper curly quotation marks.

 
 

The Unicode mapping for PostScript Standard Encoding preserves the typographic approximation convention by mapping its equivalent of ASCII grave and single-quote to the Unicode curly quotation mark characters.

Keyboard layouts 

Typographical quotation marks are almost absent on keyboards.

In typewriter keyboards, the curved quotation marks were not implemented. Instead, to save space, the straight quotation marks were invented as a compromise. Even in countries that did not use curved quotation marks, angular quotation marks were not implemented either.

Computer keyboards followed the steps of typewriter keyboards. Most computer keyboards do not have specific keys for curved quotation marks or angled quotation marks. This may also have to do with computer character sets:
 IBM character sets generally do not have curved quotation mark characters, therefore, keys for the curved quotation marks are absent in most IBM computer keyboards.
 Microsoft followed the example of IBM in its character set and keyboard design. Curved quotation marks were implemented later in Windows character sets, but most Microsoft computer keyboards do not have a dedicated key for the curved quotation mark characters. On keyboards with the  key or both the  key and the numeric keypad, they are accessible through a series of keystrokes that involve these keys.  Also, techniques using their Unicode code points are available; see Unicode input.
 Macintosh character sets have always had curved quotation marks available. Nevertheless, these are mostly accessible through a series of keystrokes, involving the  key.

In languages that use the curved “...” quotation marks, they are available in:
 none

In languages that use the angular «...» quotation marks, they are available in:
 Macintosh Arabic keyboard;
 Armenian keyboard
 Canadian keyboard
 French BÉPO keyboard
 Greek keyboard
 Khmer keyboard
 Latvian ergonomic keyboard
 Pashto keyboard
 Persian keyboard
 Portuguese keyboard
 Syriac keyboard
 Uyghur keyboard

In languages that use the corner bracket 「...」 quotation marks, they are available in:
 Japanese keyboard

In languages that use the angle bracket 《...》 they are available in:
 Mongolian keyboard
 New Tai Lue keyboard

In languages that use the curved „...“ quotation marks, they are available in:
 Bulgarian keyboard
 Georgian keyboard
 Macedonian keyboard

In languages that use the curved „...” quotation marks, they are available in:
 Romanian Standard SR 13392:2004 keyboard

In languages that use the curved ”...” quotation marks, they are available in:
 none

Curved quotes within and across applications 
Historically, support for curved quotes was a problem in information technology, primarily because the widely used ASCII character set did not include a representation for them.

The term "smart quotes", is from the name in several word processors of a function aimed this problem: automatically converting straight quotes typed by the user into curved quotes, the feature attempts to be "smart" enough to determine whether the punctuation marked opening or closing. Since curved quotes are the typographically correct ones, word processors have traditionally offered curved quotes to users (at minimum as available characters). Before Unicode was widely accepted and supported, this meant representing the curved quotes in whatever 8-bit encoding the software and underlying operating system was using. The character sets for Windows and Macintosh used two different pairs of values for curved quotes, while ISO 8859-1 (historically the default character set for the Unixes and older Linux systems) has no curved quotes, making cross-platform and -application compatibility difficult.

Performance by these "smart quotes" features was far from perfect overall (variance potential by e.g. subject matter, formatting/style convention, user typing habits). As many word processors (including Microsoft Word and OpenOffice.org) have the function enabled by default, users may not have realized that the ASCII-compatible straight quotes they were typing on their keyboards ended up as something different (conversely users could incorrectly assume its functioning in other applications, e.g. composing emails).

The curved apostrophe is the same character as the closing single quote. "Smart quotes" features wrongly convert initial apostrophes (as in 'tis, 'em, 'til, and '89) into opening single quotes. (An example of this error appears in the advertisements for the television show 'Til Death). The two very different functions of this character can cause confusion, particularly in British styles, in which single quotes are the standard primary.

Unicode support has since become the norm for operating systems. Thus, in at least some cases, transferring content containing curved quotes (or any other non-ASCII characters) from a word processor to another application or platform has been less troublesome, provided all steps in the process (including the clipboard if applicable) are Unicode-aware. But there are still applications which still use the older character sets, or output data using them, and thus problems still occur.

There are other considerations for including curved quotes in the widely used markup languages HTML, XML, and SGML. If the encoding of the document supports direct representation of the characters, they can be used, but doing so can cause difficulties if the document needs to be edited by someone who is using an editor that cannot support the encoding. For example, many simple text editors only handle a few encodings or assume that the encoding of any file opened is a platform default, so the quote characters may appear as the generic replacement character  or "mojibake" (gibberish). HTML includes a set of entities for curved quotes: &lsquo; (left single), &rsquo; (right single or apostrophe), &sbquo; (low 9 single), &ldquo; (left double), &rdquo; (right double), and &bdquo; (low 9 double). XML does not define these by default, but specifications based on it can do so, and XHTML does. In addition, while the HTML 4, XHTML and XML specifications allow specifying numeric character references in either hexadecimal or decimal, SGML and older versions of HTML (and many old implementations) only support decimal references. Thus, to represent curly quotes in XML and SGML, it is safest to use the decimal numeric character references. That is, to represent the double curly quotes use &#8220; and &#8221;, and to represent single curly quotes use &#8216; and &#8217;. Both numeric and named references function correctly in almost every modern browser. While using numeric references can make a page more compatible with outdated browsers, using named references are safer for systems that handle multiple character encodings (i.e. RSS aggregators and search results).

In Windows file and folder names, the straight double quotation mark is prohibited, as it is a reserved character.  The curved quotation marks, as well as the straight single quotation mark, are permitted.

Usenet and email 

The style of quoting known as Usenet quoting uses the greater-than sign,  prepended to a line of text to mark it as a quote. This convention was later standardized in RFC 3676, and was adopted subsequently by many email clients when automatically including quoted text from previous messages (in plain text mode).

Unicode code point table 

In Unicode, 30 characters are marked Quotation Mark=Yes by character property. They all have general category "Punctuation", and a subcategory Open, Close, Initial, Final or Other (Ps, Pe, Pi, Pf, Po). Several other Unicode characters with quotation mark semantics lack the character property.

Explanatory notes

References

External links 

 "Curling Quotes in HTML, SGML, and XML", David A Wheeler (2017)
 "ASCII and Unicode quotation marks" by Markus Kuhn (1999) – includes detailed discussion of the ASCII 'backquote' problem
 The Gallery of "Misused" Quotation Marks
 "Commonly confused characters", Greg's References Pages, Greg Baker (2016)
 "Smart Quotes", David Dunham (2006)
 "How to type “smart quotes” (U+201C, U+201D)", on Unix/Linux, at Stack Exchange
 Index of quotation-marks-related material at the EnglishGrammar website
 
 "Œuvrez les guillemets" , Pauline Morfouace (2002) – French quotation mark typography

Punctuation
Typographical symbols